Lennart Askerlund (9 July 1918 – 2 July 1957) was a Swedish footballer who played as a forward.

References

Association football forwards
Swedish footballers
Allsvenskan players
IFK Eskilstuna players
Malmö FF players
AIK Fotboll players
1918 births
1957 deaths
People from Eskilstuna
Sportspeople from Södermanland County